Schwarzlofer is a river of Tyrol, Austria and Bavaria, Germany. Its source is on the Schwarzloferalm, north of Waidring (Tyrol). It passes through Reit im Winkl (Bavaria) and flows into the Großache near Kössen (Tyrol).

See also
List of rivers of Bavaria

References

Rivers of Tyrol (state)
Rivers of Bavaria
Rivers of Austria
Rivers of Germany
International rivers of Europe